Allagash Lake is in the North Maine Woods on the boundary of Maine range 14 townships 7 and 8. Allagash Stream flows into the northwest corner of the lake from Allagash Pond, Crescent Pond, and Mud Pond in township 9 range 15. Allagash Stream overflows the northeast corner of the lake and flows  through Little Round Pond into Chamberlain Lake. Chamberlain Lake originally overflowed through Eagle Lake and Churchill Lake to the Allagash River; but was diverted through Telos Cut to the Penobscot River in the 1850s. Allagash Lake provides good habitat for togue and squaretail.

Sources

Lakes of Piscataquis County, Maine
North Maine Woods
Allagash River
Penobscot River
Lakes of Maine